The following is a list of Formula One records:

 List of Formula One driver records
 List of Formula One constructor records
 List of Formula One engine records
 List of Formula One tyre records
 List of Formula One race records

Formula One records